Lettuce speckles mottle virus (LSMV) is a pathogenic plant virus.

External links
ICTVdB—The Universal Virus Database: Lettuce speckles mottle virus
Family Groups—The Baltimore Method

Umbraviruses
Viral plant pathogens and diseases